is a Japanese football player currently playing for Fukui United.

Career 

Oshitani signed transfer to J3 club, Fujieda MYFC in 15 January 2021.

On 11 January 2023, Oshitani announcement officially transfer to Fukui United for upcoming 2023 season.

Career statistics

Club 

Updated to the start from 2023 season.

Honours 

 Tokushima Vortis
 J2 League: 2020

References

External links 

Profile at Nagoya Grampus

1989 births
Living people
Association football people from Shizuoka Prefecture
Japanese footballers
J1 League players
J2 League players
J3 League players
Júbilo Iwata players
FC Gifu players
Fagiano Okayama players
Nagoya Grampus players
Tokushima Vortis players
Fujieda MYFC players
Fukui United FC players
Association football forwards